Exeter station or Exeter railway station may refer to:

Australia:
Exeter railway station, New South Wales, serving Exeter, New South Wales
Exeter railway station, Adelaide, South Australia, A former station on the Semaphore railway line

England:
Exeter Central railway station, a London and South Western Railway station in Exeter, Devon, England
Exeter St Davids railway station, a Great Western Railway station in Exeter, Devon, England
Exeter St Thomas railway station, a Great Western Railway in Exeter, Devon, England
Other railway stations in Exeter

United States:
Exeter station (New Hampshire), an Amtrak station in Exeter, New Hampshire

See also
Exeter (disambiguation)